All I Want Is You may refer to:

Albums 
 All I Want Is You (album), a 2010 album by Miguel
 All I Want Is You, a 2001 album by Darrell Evans

Songs 
 "All I Want Is You" (911 song)
 "All I Want Is You" (Agnes song)
 "All I Want Is You" (Carly Simon song) 
 "All I Want Is You" (Damien Leith song)
 "All I Want Is You" (Miguel song)
 "All I Want Is You" (Roxy Music song)
 "All I Want Is You" (U2 song)
 "Come On Over Baby (All I Want Is You)", a song by Christina Aguilera
 "Dig a Pony" or "All I Want Is You", a song by the Beatles
 "All I Want Is You", a song by Ball Park Music from Happiness and Surrounding Suburbs
 "All I Want Is You", a song by Barry Louis Polisar, featured in the opening credits of Juno
 "All I Want Is You", a song by Brooke Hogan from The Redemption
 "All I Want Is You", a song by Bryan Adams from Waking Up the Neighbours
 "All I Want Is You", a song by Emerson, Lake & Palmer from Love Beach
 "All I Want Is You", a song by The Escorts
 "All I Want Is You", a song by Idle Flowers, led by René Berg
 "All I Want Is You", a song by Justin Bieber from Under the Mistletoe
 "All I Want Is You", a song by M-Flo from Square One
 "All I Want Is You", a song by Rockmelons
 "All I Want Is You", a song by Roxy Music from Country Life
 "All I Want Is You", a song by Take That from Everything Changes

Other media 
 All I Want Is You, a novel by Martina Reilly
 "All I Want Is You", an episode of Instant Star

See also 
 All I Want Is You... and You... and You..., a 1974 British comedy film 
 "You Might Think", a 1984 song by The Cars which also prominently features this phrase